Xiangji Temple is a Buddhist temple located in Gongshu District of Hangzhou, Zhejiang, China.

History
The temple was first construction as "Xingfu Temple" in 978 and given its present name "Xiangji Temple" in the reign of Emperor Zhenzong of the Northern Song dynasty (960–1127). 

The temple was destroyed by fire in the 13th century during the fall of the Yuan dynasty (1271–1368). 

In 1713, in the Kangxi era of the Qing dynasty (1644–1911), the Eastern Pagoda and West Pagoda were erected in the temple.

In 1963, the two pagodas was classified as municipal level cultural heritages by the Hangzhou Municipal Government. 

In 1968, during the Cultural Revolution, the Red Guards had attacked the temple, and the Eastern Pagoda was demolished.

With the support of the local government, a modern restoration of the entire temple complex was carried out in 2009.

Architecture

Western Pagoda
The nine story and octagonal-based Chinese pagoda is made of brick and stone. The brick base of the pagoda is shaped as a sumeru pedestal.

References

Buddhist temples in Hangzhou
Buildings and structures in Hangzhou
Tourist attractions in Hangzhou
2009 establishments in China
21st-century Buddhist temples
Religious buildings and structures completed in 2009